Mesnil-Martinsart is a commune in the Somme département in Hauts-de-France in northern France.

Geography

Population

Personalities
 Louis-Fernand Flutre (1892-1978), an academic from the area, published two works on the village in 1955: Mesnil-Martinsart (Somme) Essai d'histoire locale and Le Parler picard de Mesnil-Martinsart (Somme) Phonétique, morphologie, syntaxe, vocabulaire.

See also
Communes of the Somme department

References

Communes of Somme (department)